Marty Riessen and Margaret Court were the defending champions but both players chose not to participate.

Owen Davidson and Billie Jean King won in the final 6–3, 7–5 against Bob Maud and Betty Stöve.

Seeds

Draw

Finals

Top half

Section 1

Section 2

Bottom half

Section 3

Section 4

References

External links
1971 US Open – Doubles draws and results at the International Tennis Federation

Mixed Doubles
US Open (tennis) by year – Mixed doubles